Preston Burpo (born September 26, 1972 in Bethesda, Maryland) is a retired American soccer player who is currently the goalkeeper coach for Austin FC in Major League Soccer.

College 
Burpo played collegiate soccer at Southern New Hampshire University from 1992 to 1995. During his career there he earned a goals against average of 1.19 and recorded 38 shutouts. He was the first Penman to earn All-Region honors in 1992.

Playing career 
Upon graduating in 1995 he had brief stints with New Hampshire Phantoms and Boston Storm of the USISL, and also played briefly with the Jamaican club team Harbor View FC. In 1997, he signed with Seattle Sounders of the USL First Division where he would play for the next nine years. During his career with the Sounders, Burpo appeared 143 times, notching 38 shutouts, 631 saves, and a GAA of 1.19 along the way.

On March 17, 2006, Burpo signed his first contract with Major League Soccer to play for C.D. Chivas USA. On November 26, 2007, he was traded to San Jose Earthquakes in exchange for a fourth-round pick in the 2008 MLS SuperDraft. He never appeared in a match for San Jose before being traded with a fourth-round pick in the 2009 MLS SuperDraft to Colorado Rapids in exchange for Jovan Kirovski and Kelly Gray on May 21, 2008.

On January 22, 2010, Burpo was part of a four-player trade that sent him and Cory Gibbs to New England Revolution in exchange for Wells Thompson and the rights to Jeff Larentowicz. He opened the season as the Revs' starting goalkeeper while Matt Reis was out injured.

On May 29, 2010, in a game against New York Red Bulls, Burpo's tibia and fibula snapped when he collided with NYRB striker Dane Richards while challenging for the ball at the edge of his penalty area; many observers compared the injury to the one which ended the career of American football star Joe Theismann in 1985, and the similar double-break which ended the career of English Premier League player David Busst in 1996.

After the 2010 MLS season New England declined Burpo's contract option and he elected to participate in the 2010 MLS Re-Entry Draft. Burpo became a free agent when he was not selected in the Re-Entry Draft. He did not play a competitive soccer game after his injury.

Coaching 
Burpo spent the 2011 season as a scout for the United States Soccer Federation. On October 3, 2011, he was announced as the goalkeeper coach for Major League Soccer expansion side Montreal Impact.  He was the goalkeeper coach at D.C. United in the 2013 and 2014 seasons.  Under his tutelage, Bill Hamid became the 2014 MLS Goalkeeper of the Year.

References

External links
 

1972 births
Living people
Soccer players from Maryland
American expatriate soccer players
American soccer players
American expatriate sportspeople in Jamaica
Association football goalkeepers
Boston Storm players
Chivas USA players
Colorado Rapids players
Expatriate footballers in Jamaica
Harbour View F.C. players
New England Revolution players
Seacoast United Phantoms players
People from Bethesda, Maryland
San Jose Earthquakes players
Seattle Sounders (1994–2008) players
Southern New Hampshire Penmen men's soccer players
Major League Soccer players
USL Second Division players
USL First Division players
A-League (1995–2004) players
D.C. United non-playing staff
CF Montréal non-playing staff
New York Red Bulls non-playing staff
Austin FC non-playing staff